The women's hammer throw event at the 2015 Asian Athletics Championships was held on June 3.

Results

References

Hammer
Hammer throw at the Asian Athletics Championships
2015 in women's athletics